Steinbukampen is a mountain in Lom Municipality in Innlandet county, Norway. The mountain is surrounded by several other notable mountains including Veopallan and Veotinden to the south, Styggehøi and Vestre Hestlægerhøe to the southeast, Nautgardstinden to the east, Glittertinden to the north, Galdhøpiggen to the west, and Veobreahesten to the southwest.

See also
List of mountains of Norway

References

Lom, Norway
Mountains of Innlandet
One-thousanders of Norway
Jotunheimen